The Protestant Church in Switzerland (PCS), formerly named Federation of Swiss Protestant Churches until 31 December 2019, is a federation of 25 member churches – 24 cantonal churches and the Evangelical-Methodist Church of Switzerland. The PCS is not a church in a theological understanding, because every member is independent with their own theological and formal organisation. It serves as a legal umbrella before the federal government and represents the church in international relations.
Except for the Evangelical-Methodist Church, which covers all of Switzerland, the member churches are restricted to a certain territory.

The president of the PCS is Rita Famos.

History
The Reformation spread primarily into the cities of Switzerland, which was then composed of loosely connected cantons. Breakthroughs began in the 1520s in Zurich under Zwingli, in Bern in 1528 under Berchtold Haller, and in Basel in 1529 under Johannes Oecolampadius. After the death of Zwingli in 1531, the Reformation continued. The French-speaking cities Neuchâtel, Geneva and Lausanne changed to the Reformation ten years later under William Farel and John Calvin coming from France. The Zwingli and Calvin branches had each their theological distinctions, but in 1549 under the lead of Bullinger and Calvin they came to a common agreement in the Consensus Tigurinus (Zürich Consent), and 1566 in the Second Helvetic Confession. The German Reformed ideological center was Zurich, while the French-speaking Reformed movement bastion was Geneva.

A feature of the Swiss Reformed churches in the Zwinglian tradition is their historically very close links to the cantons, which is only loosening gradually in the present.. In cities where the Reformed faith became leading theology, several confessions were written, some of them:
The 67 Articles of Zurich
Theses of Berne 1528
Berne Synodus 1532
Confession of Geneva 1537
Second Helvetic Confession written by Bullinger in 1566

In the mid 19th century, opposition to liberal theology and interventions by the state led to secessions in several cantonal churches. One of these secessionist churches still exists today, the Evangelical Free Church of Geneva, founded in 1849, while two others reunited with the Swiss Reformed Church in 1943 and 1966. An important issue to liberal theologians was the Apostles' Creed. They questioned its binding character. This caused a heated debate. Until the late 1870s, most cantonal reformed churches stopped prescribing any particular creed.

In 1920 the Federation of Swiss Protestant Churches (- SEK-FEPS), with 24 member churches – 22 cantonal churches and 2 free churches (Free Church of Geneva and the Evangelical-Methodist Church of Switzerland), was formed to serve as a legal umbrella before the federal government and represent the church in international relations.

Social issues 
The ordination of women is allowed in all member churches.

As with most mainline European denominations, the Protestant Church in Switzerland has many member churches that permit prayer services or blessings for same-sex civil unions. As early as 1999, the Reformed churches in St. Gallen, Fribourg, and Lucerne had allowed church celebration services for same-sex couples. The Reformed Church in Aargau has also permitted prayer services of thanksgiving to celebrate a same-sex civil union. The Reformed Church of Vaud, in 2013, also permitted prayer services as a way for same-sex couples to celebrate their civil union. Other member churches that allow either prayer services or blessings for same-sex union are the churches in Bern-Jura-Solothurn, Schaffhausen, Tessin, Thurgau, and Zürich. Like many European Protestant denominations, several of the Swiss Reformed churches have openly welcomed gay and lesbian members to celebrate their civil unions within a church context. As early as 1999, the Reformed Churches in St. Gallen, Fribourg, and Lucerne had permitted prayer and celebration services for same-sex couples to recognize their civil unions. Since then, the Reformed Church in Aargau has also allowed for prayer services to celebrate same-sex couples. To date, seven other Swiss Reformed churches, including Bern-Jura-Solothurn, Graubünden, Schaffhausen, Ticino, Thurgau, Vaud, and Zürich, have allowed the blessing of same-sex unions for same-sex civil unions. In August 2019 with the Evangelical Reformed Church of the Canton of Zürich the first church of the Swiss Reformed Church allowed the blessing of same-sex marriages and the Swiss Reformed Church allowed blessing of same-sex marriages for their member churches.

Members of the communion 
Organizationally, the Reformed Churches in Switzerland remain separate, cantonal units. The German churches are more in the Zwinglian tradition; the French more in the Calvinist tradition. They are governed synodically and their relation to the respective canton (in Switzerland, there are no church-state regulations at a national level) ranges from independent to close collaboration, depending on historical developments. The exception is the Evangelical-Methodist Church, which is nationally active.

Reformed Churches in the Swiss cantons:

 Reformed Church of Aargau
 Evangelical-Reformed Church of Appenzell
 Evangelical Reformed Church of the Canton Basel-Landschaft
 Evangelical-Reformed Church of the Canton Basel-Stadt
 Reformed Churches of the Canton Bern-Jura-Solothurn
 Evangelical Reformed Church of the Canton Freiburg
 Protestant Church of Geneva
 
 
 Evangelical Reformed Church of the Canton of Lucerne
 
 
 
 Evangelical-Reformed Church of the Canton of St. Gallen
 Evangalical-Reformed Church of the Canton of Schaffhausen
 
 
 
 Evangelical Church of the Canton of Thurgau
 Evangelical-Reformed Church of Uri
 Evangelical Reformed Church of the Canton of Vaud
 Evangelical Reformed Church in Valais
 Evangelical-Reformed Church of the Canton of Zürich
 
 United Methodist Church (Swiss part)

See also 
 Religion in Switzerland

Notes

References

External links

Protestantism in Switzerland
 01
Members of the World Communion of Reformed Churches
Members of the World Alliance of Reformed Churches
Members of the World Council of Churches
Switzerland
1920 establishments in Switzerland
Christian organizations established in 1920